The 2012–13 South Alabama Jaguars basketball team represented the University of South Alabama during the 2012–13 NCAA Division I men's basketball season. The Jaguars were led by head coach Ronnie Arrow, in his sixth year of his second stint as head coach and 13th year overall, for the first 10 games until his abrupt resignation. They were led by interim head coach Jeff Price the remainder of the season. They played their home games at the Mitchell Center, and were members of the East Division of the Sun Belt Conference. They finished the season 17–13, 14–6 in Sun Belt play to finish in second place in the East Division. They lost in the quarterfinals of the Sun Belt tournament to WKU. They were invited to the 2013 CIT where they lost in the first round to Tulane.

Roster

Schedule

|-
!colspan=9| Canada Tour
 

|-
!colspan=9| Exhibition

|-
!colspan=9| Regular season

|-
!colspan=9| 2013 Sun Belt Conference men's basketball tournament

|-
!colspan=9| 2013 CIT

References

South Alabama Jaguars men's basketball seasons
South Alabama
South Alabama
2012 in sports in Alabama
2013 in sports in Alabama